The Arab Baath Movement ( Ḥarakat al-Bath al-‘Arabī), also literally translated as Arab Resurrection Movement or Arab Renaissance Movement, was the Baathist political movement and predecessor of the Arab Socialist Baath Party. The party was first named Arab Ihya Movement (Ḥarakat al-Iḥyā al-‘Arabī) literally translated as Arab Revitalization Movement, until 1943 when it adopted the name "Baath". It was founded in 1940 by Michel Aflaq. Its founders, Aflaq and Bitar, were both associated with nationalism and socialism.

History
The Movement was formed in 1940 as the Arab Ihya Movement by Syrian expatriate Michel Aflaq.

Shortly after being founded, the Movement became involved in anti-colonial Arab nationalist militant activities, including Aflaq founding the Syrian Committee to Help Iraq that was created in 1941 to support the anti-British and pro-Axis government of Iraq against the British during the Anglo-Iraqi War of 1941. The Syrian Committee sent weapons and volunteers to fight alongside Iraqi forces against the British.

Aflaq unsuccessfully ran as a candidate for the Syrian parliament in 1943. After the Syrian election defeat, the Movement sought cooperation with other parties in elections in Syria, including the Arab Socialist Movement  of Akram El-Hourani.

The Party merged with Al-Arsuzi's Arab Baath Party in 1947, and al-Hawrani's Arab Socialist Movement later merged into the party in the 1950s to establish the Arab Socialist Baath Party.

References

Arab nationalism in Syria
Ba'athist parties
Defunct political parties in Syria
Defunct nationalist parties
Defunct socialist parties in Asia
History of the Ba'ath Party
Pan-Arabist political parties
Political parties disestablished in 1947
Political parties established in 1940
Nationalist parties in Syria
Socialist parties in Syria